{{DISPLAYTITLE:Indium (111In) imciromab}}

Indium (111In) imciromab (trade name Myoscint) is a mouse monoclonal antibody labelled with the radioisotope Indium-111. It was used for cardiac imaging, but withdrawn in 1993.

See also
Nuclear medicine

References

Radiopharmaceuticals